James Dundas was a Scottish VC recipient.

James Dundas may also refer to:

 James Dundas (MP), MP for Linlithgowshire (1770–74)
 James Dundas, Lord Arniston (1620–1679), Scottish politician and judge
 James Whitley Deans Dundas (1785–1862), Royal Navy officer
 James Dundas (bishop), Anglican bishop

See also
 
 Dundas (surname)